Virginia Lugenia McLaurin (nee Campbell, March 12, 1909 – November 14, 2022) was an American community volunteer and a semi-supercentarian or a supercentenarian, since her birth certificate was not found but she is believed to have been born between 1909 and 1917. Being born under the Jim Crow Laws, such fact is not unusual, as the public records at the time for Black and Native Americans were sometimes missing or inaccurate.

A resident of Washington, D.C., she gained notability after a video of her dancing with President Barack Obama and First Lady Michelle Obama at the White House went viral, where she attended to receive the President's Volunteer Service Award for her service to the community on February 18, 2016, during a reception held for annual Black History Month, and also for her longevity claim, which although reported extensively by the media press remained unsourced by government and official records.

Biography

Early life
McLaurin was born to a Black family of sharecroppers in Cheraw, South Carolina; her father John Oliver Campbell died when she was one and her mother Flora Ella McQueen taught her to sew.

She stated "My Grandfather was Methodist minister, and my father was a Baptist".

According to McLaurin, she "was birthed by a midwife and the birthday put in a Bible somewhere." In her childhood, she worked in the fields with her parents, shucking corn and picking cotton.

She grew up during the Jim Crow era when racial segregation was widespread throughout the Southern United States.
Never receiving an education past third grade, McLaurin got married at 13 and later moved to New Jersey as part of the Great Migration. Widowed when her husband was killed in a bar fight, she moved to Washington D.C. to be closer to her sister in 1939.  Around this time she took responsibility for a three-year-old boy after his father had remarried and the new wife did not want to take on the child.  McLaurin formally adopted the boy when he was aged 14.

In her career, she worked as a seamstress, as a domestic helper for families in Silver Spring, Maryland, and managed a laundry shop.

Community volunteer
From the early 1980s, McLaurin volunteered forty hours per week at Roots Public Charter School through AmeriCorps Seniors.  She joined the United Planning Organization Foster Grandparent Program in October 1994.

In 2013, she received a volunteer community service award from Mayor Vincent C. Gray. After a TV crew publicized the fact that her apartment was infested with bed bugs in 2014, a local pest control company got rid of the infestation and gave her a free bed.

Meeting the Obamas
Towards the end of the Obama administration, friends of McLaurin recommended to members of the Obama administration that she meet with the President due to her extensive history of volunteering. In February 2016, the White House hosted McLaurin in celebration of Black History Month. Upon meeting the President and First Lady, McLaurin gave them both hugs and started dancing with them. She would later say in interviews that she never felt that she would live to visit the White House, and she never thought there would be a day she would get to meet a Black President with his Black wife while celebrating Black history. Shortly after her meeting with the Obamas, the video of her dancing with the two went viral online. According to the local press, she was afterwards referred to as D.C.'s favorite centenarian and Grandma Virginia.

On March 11, 2016, McLaurin received the President's Volunteer Service Award for her two decades of service to schoolchildren. On May 27, 2016, she attended a Washington Nationals baseball game and was presented with a custom jersey on the field.

Personal life and longevity
She had two children with her late husband; as of 2016, her daughter was alive at 83 years old; her son had died. Despite this, she estimated she had about 50 living descendants. At least one of her grandchildren had a great-grandchild, making her a great-great-great-grandmother.

In 2016, McLaurin had trouble obtaining a replacement photo ID from the Washington, D.C. Department of Motor Vehicles because of bureaucratic difficulties in getting a copy of her birth certificate from South Carolina.

On March 12, 2019, McLaurin turned 110 years old, becoming a supercentenarian. She celebrated her previous birthdays from ages 106 to 109 with her favorite basketball team, the Harlem Globetrotters.

McLaurin died at her home in Olney, Maryland, on November 14, 2022, at the claimed age of 113.

Notes

References

Longevity claims
2022 deaths
People from Cheraw, South Carolina
Activists from South Carolina
Activists from Washington, D.C.
American supercentenarians
African-American centenarians
Women supercentenarians
20th-century African-American women
21st-century African-American women
African-American activists
1909 births